Chah Nareh Cha Abbasi (also Romanized as Chāh Nareh Chā ʿAbbāsī) is a village in Sharifabad Rural District, in the Central District of Sirjan County, Kerman Province, Iran. At the 2006 census, its population was 62, in 13 families.

References 

Populated places in Sirjan County